The Swimming competition at the 9th All-Africa Games were held in Algiers, Algeria, 11 – 18 July 2007. 121 swimmers from 16 nations were entered into the 7-day competition.

All events were swum in a 50-meter (long course) pool.

Participating nations 
121 swimmers from 17 nations were entered in the Swimming competition:

}

Event schedule

m= men's event, w= women's event

Results

Men

Women

Medal standings

References 

SwimNews.com coverage: 2007-07-13; 2007-07-14, 2007-07-15, 2007-07-16, 2007-07-17, 2007-07-18
International Herald Tribune:   

Swimming at the African Games
2007 All-Africa Games
A
Swimming competitions in Algeria